Tatsuro Iwasaki (岩崎 達郎, born December 28, 1984, in Yokohama, Kanagawa Prefecture) is a Japanese former professional baseball infielder in Japan's Nippon Professional Baseball. He played for the Chunichi Dragons from 2008 to 2012 and again in 2017 and with the Tohoku Rakuten Golden Eagles from 2013 to 2015.

External links

1984 births
Chunichi Dragons players
Japanese baseball players
Living people
Nippon Professional Baseball infielders
Baseball people from Yokohama
Tohoku Rakuten Golden Eagles players